Lam Manyee is a Chinese composer and music producer from Hong Kong.

Early life 
On 10 September 1950, Lam was born in Hong Kong.

Education 
Lam graduated from the University of Hong Kong in psychology and sociology. Later she studied piano at the Santa Cecilia Conservatory in Rome from 1973 until 1976 with Franco Evangelisti and composition at the Hochschule für Musik Freiburg with Brian Ferneyhough.

Career 
Lam is a composer in Hong Kong and the United States. Lam has composed for orchestra, ballet and solo instrument. Lam has also composed over 50 film scores, music for TV and over 150 pop songs.

Works
This is a partial list of Lam's works. 
Interludes for prepared piano, 1977
Journey for chamber ensemble, 1977–78
Monologo II for cello, piano and tapes, 1980
Die Meng (Butterfly Dream), Chinese orchestra, 1978
Ceng Die, 1981
Double Triangle, ballet, 1976
Bamboo Suite, ballet, 1983
Mixed Visions, ballet, 1983
Chinese Historical Myths, ballet, 1985
ID Shuffle, ballet, 1985
Kwaidan/Emaki, ballet, 1986
Diary, ballet, 1988
Hell Screen, ballet, 1990
Stories of Aung San Suu Kyi, ballet, 1992
Open Party, ballet, 1994
Is there Life on Mars?, ballet, 1997
Dream City, ballet, 1998
Beauty and the Beast, ballet, 1999

Filmography 
 Once a Thief - Music.

References

External links
  (in English)

 Violet Lam at allmovie.com

1950 births
Living people
20th-century classical composers
Hong Kong classical composers
Hong Kong women classical composers
Hong Kong film score composers
Women film score composers
Alumni of the University of Hong Kong
Hochschule für Musik Freiburg alumni
20th-century women composers